The 2009 Temple Owls football team represented Temple University in the college 2009 NCAA Division I FBS football season. Temple competed as a member of the Mid-American Conference (MAC) East Division. The team was coached by Al Golden and played their homes game in Lincoln Financial Field.

The Owls finished the season 9–4, 7–1 in conference play to be co–champions of the MAC East Division and were invited to the EagleBank Bowl where they lost to UCLA 30–21. This was the Owls first bowl game since the Garden State Bowl in 1979.

Before the season

Recruiting

Schedule

Roster

Coaching staff

Game summaries

Villanova

Temple blew a 10-point lead over the Wildcats to ultimately lose 27-24 to the Villanova Wildcats to open the year on a sour note. This game was similar to many games last year where Temple would have a lead but be unable to finish off an opponent, such as the overtime loss to Navy and the Hail Mary loss to Buffalo last year. After a scoreless first quarter, Temple got a 10-0 halftime lead, then made it a 17-7 lead midway through the third after each scored, and Villanova scored to make it 17-14, but Temple would score again early in the 4th quarter to make it 24-14, but Villanova would shut out the Owls the rest of the way, making it 24-17 on a field goal soon after, late in the game Villanova tied it up, and just as Temple was about to go for the win, a turnover led to a Villanova field goal that gave them their first win of the year and put Temple at 0-1 to start the new year. It was also Villanova's first win against a I-A opponent since 2003, ironically it Temple. Villanova leads the series.

Penn State

Temple hadn't beaten Penn State since 1941, and that nearly 70-year losing streak remained intact, but the Owls kept themselves in the game early with a field goal and successful onside kick. Afterwards, the momentum they had gained was quickly lost as Penn State made it 21-3 at halftime and 24-6 after three. Penn State put the game out of reach with a touchdown run by Stephon Green. Soon afterwards, Penn State put their backups in, but were unable to score any more points. With the 6-31 loss, this now makes four straight games that the Owls have failed to score at least a touchdown on Penn State.

Scoring Summary

1st Quarter
 07:35 PSU Shuler 1-yard pass from Clark (Wagner kick) 0-7 PSU
 00:00 TEM McManus 25-yard field goal 3-7 PSU

2nd Quarter
 05:46 PSU Royster 7-yard run (Wagner kick) 3-14 PSU
 01:03 PSU Moye 4-yard pass from Clark (Wagner kick) 3-21 PSU

3rd Quarter
 12:06 TEM McManus 35-yard field goal 6-21 PSU
 06:23 PSU Wagner 27-yard field goal 6-24 PSU

4th Quarter
 11:25 Green 3-yard run (Wagner kick) 6-31 PSU

Buffalo

With the huge blowout win over Buffalo, Temple was able to get revenge for the previous two years, including a last second loss on a Hail Mary and a blowout loss the year before. This also gave Temple their first win of the year.

Scoring Summary

1st Quarter
 6:02 TEMPLE McManus 35-yard field goal 0-3 TEMPLE

2nd Quarter
 12:38 UB Principe 36-yard field goal 3-3
 10:14 UB Principe 32-yard field goal 6-3 UB
 10:01 TEMPLE Nixon 92-yard kickoff return (McManus kick) 6-10 TEMPLE
 2:59 TEMPLE McManus 22-yard field goal 6-13 TEMPLE
 0:07 TEMPLE Joseph 95-yard interception return (McManus kick) 6-20 TEMPLE

3rd Quarter
 11:34 TEMPLE Rodriguez 5-yard pass from Charlton (McManus kick) 6-27 TEMPLE
 8:17 TEMPLE McManus 33-yard field goal 6-30 TEMPLE

4th Quarter
 11:56 UB Rivers 6-yard pass from Maynard (Principe kick) 13-30 TEMPLE
 9:23 TEMPLE Pierce 18-yard run (McManus kick) 13-37 TEMPLE

Eastern Michigan

With the 24-6 win over Eastern Michigan, the Owls were now .500 and undefeated in the MAC.

Ball State

Despite going 12-2 last year and being ranked as high as #12, the Ball State Cardinals remained winless this  year after giving Temple a game that appeared closer than it really was. Temple took a 10-0 lead, but fell behind 13-10, but soon retook the lead and would hold on for the 24-19 win, giving up a meaningless touchdown on the game's final play to make the game look like a nailbiter. Temple also was 3-0 in the MAC and 3-2 overall with the win.

Scoring Summary

1st Quarter
 07:12 TEMPLE McManus 27-yard field goal 0-3 TEMPLE
 04:47 TEMPLE Nixon 28-yard pass from Charlton (McManus kick) 0-10 TEMPLE

3rd Quarter
 10:59 BSU Gibson 50-yard pass from Page (McGarvey kick) 7-10 TEMPLE
 08:47 BSU Williams 0-yard fumble recovery (McGarvey kick failed) 13-10 BSU
 04:48 TEMPLE Pierce 2-yard run (McManus kick) 13-17 TEMPLE

4th Quarter
 03:29 TEMPLE Pierce 3-yard run (McManus kick) 13-24 TEMPLE
 00:00 BSU Ifft 2-yard pass from Page 19-24 TEMPLE

Army

Scoring Summary

1st Quarter
 TEMPLE TD 10:43 Bernard Pierce 1 Yd Run (Brandon Mcmanus Kick)  0-7

2nd Quarter
 TEMPLE TD 13:17 Jason Harper 37 Yd Pass From Vaughn Charlton (Pat Failed)  0-13 
 ARMY FG 02:11 Alex Carlton 24 Yd  3-13

3rd Quarter
 ARMY FG 07:50 Alex Carlton 23 Yd  6-13 
 ARMY TD 04:06 Ali Villanueva 4 Yd Pass From Trent Steelman (Alex Carlton Kick)  13-13

4th Quarter
 TEMPLE TD 07:25 Steve Maneri 6 Yd Pass From Vaughn Charlton (Brandon Mcmanus Kick)  13-20 
 TEMPLE TD 05:26 Kee-ayre Griffin 1 Yd Run (Brandon Mcmanus Kick)  13-27

Toledo

Temple defeated a favored Toledo team 40-24 in the Glass Bowl. Like Temple, Toledo had improved greatly from last year.

Navy

With this win, Temple became bowl eligible.

Scoring Summary

1st Quarter
 NAVY FG 03:11 Joe Buckley 30 Yd  0-3

2nd Quarter
 TEMPLE TD 11:11 Bernard Pierce 68 Yd Run (Brandon Mcmanus Kick)  7-3 
 NAVY TD 01:55 David Wright 3 Yd Punt Return (Joe Buckley Kick)  7-10 
 TEMPLE TD 01:41 James Nixon 100 Yd Kickoff Return (Brandon Mcmanus Kick)  14-10

3rd Quarter
 TEMPLE FG 12:08 Brandon McManus 45 Yd  17-10 
 NAVY TD 07:54 Vince Murray 5 Yd Run (Joe Buckley Kick)  17-17

4th Quarter
 NAVY TD 14:55 Kriss Proctor 2 Yd Run (Joe Buckley Kick)  17-24 
 TEMPLE FG 12:02 Brandon McManus 21 Yd  20-24 
 TEMPLE TD 02:41 Bernard Pierce 41 Yd Run (Brandon Mcmanus Kick)  27-24

Miami (Ohio)

Scoring Summary

1st Quarter
 11:20 TEMPLE Bernard Pierce 1 Yd Run (Brandon Mcmanus Kick)  0-7 
 07:57 MIAMI (Ohio) Trevor Cook 20 Yd  3-7 
 01:50 TEMPLE Vaughn Charlton 1 Yd Run (Brandon Mcmanus Kick)  3-14

2nd Quarter
 05:21 TEMPLE Bernard Pierce 7 Yd Run (Brandon Mcmanus Kick)  3-21 
 03:41 MIAMI (Ohio) Armand Robinson 11 Yd Pass From Zac Dysert (Trevor Cook  Kick)  10-21 
 00:11 MIAMI (Ohio) Trevor Cook 26 Yd  13-21

3rd Quarter
 09:17 TEMPLE Brandon McManus 42 Yd  13-24 
 02:37 TEMPLE Bernard Pierce 14 Yd Run (Brandon Mcmanus Kick)  13-31

4th Quarter
 13:35 MIAMI (Ohio) Steve Marck 24 Yd Pass From Zac Dysert (Trevor Cook Kick)  20-31 
 08:52 MIAMI (Ohio) Armand Robinson 14 Yd Pass From Zac Dysert (Two-Point Run Conversion Failed)  26-31 
 02:36 MIAMI (Ohio) Thomas Merriweather 2 Yd Run (Two-Point Pass Conversion Failed)  32-31 
 00:03 TEMPLE Brandon McManus 18 Yd  32-34

Akron

Scoring Summary

1st Quarter
 TEMPLE TD 12:34 Michael Campbell 63 Yd Pass From Chester Stewart (Brandon Mcmanus Kick)  7-0 
 AKRON TD 09:30 Andre Jones 9 Yd Pass From Patrick Nicely (Branko Rogovic Kick)  7-7 
 AKRON FG 05:00 Branko Rogovic 45 Yd  7-10 
 AKRON TD 03:06 Sean Fobbs Recovered Fumble In End Zone (Branko Rogovic Kick)  7-17 
 TEMPLE TD 00:10 James Nixon 22 Yd Run (Brandon Mcmanus Kick)  14-17

2nd Quarter
 TEMPLE TD 06:15 Delano Green 66 Yd Punt Return (Brandon Mcmanus Kick)  21-17 
 TEMPLE TD 01:06 Chester Stewart 8 Yd Run (Brandon Mcmanus Kick)  28-17 
 TEMPLE TD 00:31 Bernard Pierce 2 Yd Run (Brandon Mcmanus Kick)  35-17

3rd Quarter
 TEMPLE TD 09:37 Joe Jones 24 Yd Pass From Chester Stewart (Brandon Mcmanus Kick)  42-17

4th Quarter
 TEMPLE TD 14:30 Chester Stewart 1 Yd Run (Brandon Mcmanus Kick)  49-17 
 TEMPLE TD 11:31 Matt Brown 5 Yd Run (Brandon Mcmanus Kick)  56-17

Kent State

Scoring Summary

1st Quarter
 KSU FG 08:58 Freddy Cortez 21 Yd  3-0

2nd Quarter
 TEMPLE TD 11:12 Evan Rodriguez 10 Yd Pass From Kevin Armstrong (Pat Blocked)  3-6 
 KSU TD 04:48 Kendrick Pressley 6 Yd Pass From Spencer Keith (Freddy Cortez Kick)  10-6 
 TEMPLE FG 00:17 Brandon McManus 24 Yd  10-9

3rd Quarter
 TEMPLE FG 10:41 Brandon McManus 28 Yd  10-12 
 TEMPLE TD 09:00 Matt Brown 71 Yd Run (Brandon McManus Kick)  10-19 
 TEMPLE TD 06:55 Kee-ayre Griffin 36 Yd Interception Return (Brandon McManus Kick)  10-26 
 TEMPLE TD 01:38 Matt Brown 1 Yd Run (Brandon McManus Kick)  10-33

4th Quarter
 TEMPLE TD 13:56 Delano Green 52 Yd Punt Return (Brandon McManus Kick)  10-40 
 TEMPLE TD 09:08 Delano Green 50 Yd Run (Brandon McManus Kick)  10-47 
 KSU FG 04:22 Freddy Cortez 46 Yd  13-47

Ohio

Ohio defeated Temple, and by virtue of a tie-breaker, advanced to the MAC Championship Game. Temple still won a share of the MAC East Division.

EagleBank Bowl 
The UCLA Bruins (6-6) played the Temple Owls (9-3) at the 2009 EagleBank Bowl at RFK Memorial Stadium in Washington, D.C. The bowl game was scheduled to start at 4:30 PM US EST on Tuesday, December 29, 2009. Temple was playing in its first bowl game since the 1979 Garden State Bowl and made only its third bowl appearance in school history. After a dominant first half, UCLA staged a second half rally, and defeated the Owls 30-21.

UCLA

References

Temple
Temple Owls football seasons
Temple Owls football